

Robert Galbraith (18 February 187813 May 1949) was a United States Navy recipient of the Medal of Honor for his actions in the Philippine–American War.

Personal life
In 1930, Galbraith was yet-unmarried and living on a farm in Brooklyn; he was an inspector with "Cloth U.S. Goom". By 1942, he had moved to Oceanside, New York and told the Selective Service System that he was retired.

US Navy
Galbraith enlisted in the US Navy prior to his service during the Spanish–American War.  In 1899, Galbraith received the Medal of Honor for his service while deployed during the Philippine–American War; Gunner's Mate Third Class Galbraith displayed "extraordinary heroism and gallantry while under fire of the enemy at El Pardo, Cebu, Philippine Islands, 12 and 13 September 1899."  Galbraith's medal was issued by the United States Department of War's "General Orders No. 531, November 21, 1899".  Prior to leaving the Navy as a quartermaster third class, Galbraith served during World War I.

See also
 List of Philippine–American War Medal of Honor recipients

References

External links
 

1878 births
1949 deaths
American military personnel of the Philippine–American War
United States Navy personnel of the Spanish–American War
United States Navy personnel of World War I
burials at Long Island National Cemetery
people from Brooklyn
Philippine–American War recipients of the Medal of Honor
United States Navy Medal of Honor recipients
United States Navy sailors